Bloomburg High School is a public high school located in the city of Bloomburg, Texas (USA). It is classified as a 1A school by the UIL. It is a part of the Bloomburg Independent School District located in eastern Cass County, near the Texas-Louisiana border. In 2015, the school was rated "Met Standard" by the Texas Education Agency.

Athletics
The Bloomburg Wildcats compete in the following sports:

Baseball
Basketball
Cross Country
Golf
Softball
Tennis
Track and Field

References

External links
Bloomburg ISD website

Public high schools in Texas
Schools in Cass County, Texas
Public middle schools in Texas